Autophila pauli is a moth of the family Erebidae first described by Charles Boursin in 1940. It is found in arid areas of Jordan, Israel, Sinai, and Egypt.

There are probably two generations per year. Adults are on wing from January to August.

External links

Toxocampina
Moths of the Middle East
Moths described in 1940